Azumanishiki Eizaburo (born Eizaburo Hoshino; October 2, 1940 - November 9, 1994) was a sumo wrestler from Tokyo, Japan. He made his professional debut in September May 1956, and reached the top division in September 1962. His highest rank was maegashira 15. He left the sumo world upon retirement in September 1967.

Career record
The Kyushu tournament was first held in 1957, and the Nagoya tournament in 1958.

See also
Glossary of sumo terms
List of past sumo wrestlers
List of sumo tournament second division champions

References

1940 births
Japanese sumo wrestlers
Sumo people from Tokyo
1994 deaths